Kanang anak Langkau: The Iban Warrior is a 2017 Malaysian biographical historical drama film directed by Bade Hj. Azmi with the script co-written by Zainal Fikri and Asmira Suhadis, detailing the life and career of a soldier, Kanang anak Langkau. The film starring Kanang's son, Langgi anak Kanang, who played the character of his father, along with Adi Putra, Johan As'ari, Livonia Ricky Guing, Jimmy Leong, Adam Shah, Aidil Aziz, Ruzana Ibrahim and Zachery Francis. The movie aired on 16 March 2017.

Plot
The film covers the life of Kanang, who is an Iban, an ethnic warrior tribe living in the interior of Sarawak, Borneo Island. Ibans believe was that their children grew up to be warriors, Kanang was taught by his grandfather about the ins and outs of the jungle. Kanang became a great hunter and tracker, until he could read the direction of wind, hearing the tiger and lion's breath, and hearing the heartbeat of a tree.

In 1965, it was the culmination of communist uprisings in Malaysia and Sarawak also exposed to the threat of communist brutality. The British Army knew about Kanang's expertise and power in the jungle and tried to persuade him to serve and help against communist militants.

Kanang's career in the military began when he joined the Sarawak Rangers Regiment as an Iban Tracker, until he became a Sergeant Major in the 8th Ranger Regiment in the Malaysian Armed Forces. Kanang and his platoon had fought to eliminate communist militants throughout the country from 1948 to 1983. The fierce battle between communist terrorists and security forces continued to reach the Korbu Forest and Tanah Hitam in Perak. During a battle at Tanah Hitam, Kanang was shot until he was seriously injured, but he continued to fight hard to defeat the communist terrorists.

Cast
 Langgi anak Kanang as Sergeant Kanang anak Langkau
 Adi Putra as Corporal Omar Awang Tengah
 Aidil Aziz as Corporal Michael Riman anak Bugat
 Zachery Francis as Lance Corporal Wan Shaipuddin Abu Kassim
 Johan As'ari as Ranger Baharuddin Bin Yahya
 Sofian Bujang as Ranger Abdullah bin Chik
 Jay Iswazir as Ranger Mohammad bin Tisman (Signals)
 Taufiq Hanafi as Second Lieutenant Johnsin anak Meling
 Lieutenant Hotin anak Lukong as Second Lieutenant Mohana Kumaran A/L Ragupatty
 Shanningavelu A/L Vellayah as Sergeant Ramli bin Othman
 Saiful Zelwany as Lance Corporal Abang Salleh bin Abang Morshidi
 Rosley Rusdi as Lance Corporal Raja Gopal A/L Supramaniam
 Ramachandran A/L Sundaram as Ranger Mustafa Kamal bin Majid
 Adam Shah as Ranger Kotap bin Buang
 Sanpagan Sannasi as Ranger Muniandy A/L Givindaraja
 Ali Arami Adzahar as Ranger Ali bin Amit
 Muhammad Faiz as Ranger Zakaria bin Akop
 Bonyca anak Chadat as Ranger Azman (Signals)
 Rahimizam bin Abdul Rahim as Ranger Abdullah bin Harun
 Ahmad Rizal bin Mohd Fazil as Ranger Rosli bin Md Isa
 Selvakumar A/L Monogran as Ranger Kanangasan
 Faiz as Ranger Zakaria
 Mimpi anak Limbi as young Kanang anak Langkau
 Livonia Ricky Guing as Helan Latai anak Intie
 Cleopatra Bibi Limah anak Minggu as young Helan Latai anak Intie
 Barba Estreina Beja as Kanang's daughter
 Ummi Aisyah as Josephine
 Jimmy Leong Siew Chye as Nam Yat communist leader
 Jerrica Lai as Chin Hua
 Ruzana Ibrahim as Senah
 Jeseph Joe as Samy
 Don Puena as Colonel C. A Loone
 Ignas Versinkas as Captain Mike Ayota
 Ted Moxham as commanding officer
 Malcom as British officer
 Haris Hadra as warrior
 Philippe Michel Vidneron as command member
 Geoff Andre Feyaerts as helicopter pilot
 Robert Christoper Armstrong as radioman
 Stefan Andreas Kunath as helicopter assistant pilot
 Tom Hermanson Snickars as flight engineer

Production 
This film is produced by Tangan Seni Sdn. Bhd. with Empire Film Solutions, acting as distributor. Langgi, Kanang's son, played the character of his own father. According to Langgi, he accidentally met with the director, Bade Hj. Azmi, was at the Kuching International Airport in 2014, took him to the acting world. The production cost was estimated at about RM6 million and filming was carried out around the Alagar farms in Taiping, Perak and Sarawak Cultural Village in Santubong, Sarawak. This film also get help from the 9th RRD Battalion in Taiping and the 10th RRD Battalion at the Muara Tuang Camp, Samarahan, Sarawak. The producer, Zainal Fitri said this film took 7 years to complete.

Release and reception 
This film was scheduled to be aired on 25 August 2016, but it was postponed due to some improvements. The official release date of the film was on 16 March 2017.

The film received positive reviews and mixed reviews from film critics. Angelin Yeoh from Star2 said "you would have to read about Kanang or have some knowledge of his actions before watching this film. Otherwise, the story will be lost to you as the movie does not do enough justice to his legacy as one of the most decorated soldiers in the history of Malaysia." Shazryn Mohd Faizal from mStar Online praised the works of this film, saying "this Kanang's film has a pretty good premise in lifting the true story of a soldier from the Iban tribe who has sacrificed to fight the communists to ensure safety of a country."

Music 
The theme song of this film is "Agi Idup Agi Ngelaban" ("as long as you still alive, you are willing to fight and sacrifice"). The theme song was created by Anuar Ab Razak and lyrics was written by Nor Azlan Rosle. Hazama was chosen to sing the theme song.

Awards

References

External links 
 
 
 Theme song

2017 films
Malaysian historical drama films
2010s historical drama films
Films shot in Malaysia